Robert Bryce Muir (23 September 1876 – 1953) was a Scottish footballer who played in the Football League for Notts County.

References

1876 births
1953 deaths
Scottish footballers
English Football League players
Scottish Football League players
Association football outside forwards
Clyde F.C. players
Kilmarnock F.C. players
Bristol Rovers F.C. players
Celtic F.C. players
Notts County F.C. players
Norwich City F.C. players
Galston F.C. players
Southern Football League players